ENSCI–Les Ateliers, the École nationale supérieure de création industrielle, is a French design school located in the 11th arrondissement of Paris. As a public commercial and industrial establishment under authority of both the Ministry of Culture and the Ministry of Industry, it is the first and only French national institute exclusively devoted to the advanced studies in design. It is a member of the Hautes Études-Sorbonne-Arts et Métiers cluster and of the Conférence des grandes écoles.

The school was founded in 1982 under the sponsorship of Jean Prouvé and Charlotte Perriand, and have been established in the same building that once housed the Ateliers Saint-Sabin of the Maison Jansen, hence its name; its premises are open 24 hours a day and seven days a week, enabling students to work according to their own production schedules and patterns. It has been classed number one design school in the Americas & Europe region by the 2011 Red Dot Award: Design Concept ranking, and the best design school in France by the 2012 L'Étudiant ranking. It is also one of the 60 best design schools in the world according to the 2007 Businessweek D-Schools list.

Degrees and programmes
The school offers five different programmes:

 Master's degree in Industrial Design (Diplôme de créateur industriel)
 Master's degree in Textile Design (Diplôme de l'Atelier national d'art textile)
 Specialized Master in Design and Contemporary Technology (Mastère spécialisé Création et technologie contemporaine)
 Specialized Master in Innovation by Design (Mastère spécialisé Innovation by design)
 Postgraduate diploma in New Design (Post-diplôme Nouveau design)

ENSCI–Les Ateliers is also one of the seven partner schools that deliver the Master of European Design degree.

Alumni
 Matali Crasset
 Florence Doléac
 Saran Diakité Kaba
Jean-Louis Frechin
Yannick Grannec
Thierry Gaugain
 Rip Hopkins
 Patrick Jouin
 Mathieu Lehanneur
 Laurent Massaloux
 Jean-Marie Massaud
 Édith Meusnier
 Inga Sempé
 Seo Eunkyo
 Constance Guisset
 Flavien Berger
 Théo Mercier
 Cécile Canel
 Jacques Averna

References

External links 

 ENSCI–Les Ateliers website.

industrielle
Design schools in France
Buildings and structures in the 11th arrondissement of Paris
industrielle
Industrial design